Parliamentary elections were held in Portugal on 11 May 1919. The three main parties that boycotted the 1918 elections returned to contest the elections. The result was a victory for the Democratic Party, which won 86 of the 163 seats in the House of Representatives and 36 of the 71 seats in the Senate.

Results

References

External links
Eleições de 1919

Legislative elections in Portugal
Portugal
1919 elections in Portugal
May 1919 events